Dreamtigers (El Hacedor, "The Maker", 1960), is a collection of poems, short essays, and literary sketches by the Argentine author Jorge Luis Borges. Divided fairly evenly between prose and verse, the collection examines the limitations of creativity. Borges regarded Dreamtigers as his most personal work. In the view of Mortimer Adler, editor of the Great Books of the Western World series, the collection was a masterpiece of 20th century literature. Literary critic Harold Bloom includes it in his Western Canon.

The original Spanish title refers to the Scots word makar, meaning "poet".

Works

Notes

External links
The Floating Library has a complete English translation of Dreamtigers.
University of Texas Press

1960 poetry books
1960 short story collections
Essay collections
Argentine poetry
Fantasy short story collections
Works by Jorge Luis Borges